The X-Files: Revelations collection is a DVD release containing selected episodes from the first to the sixth seasons of the American science fiction television series The X-Files. Released on July 8, 2008, the collection has received mostly positive response from critics. The episodes collected in the release were chosen by writers Chris Carter and Frank Spotnitz, and include entries in the series' overarching mythology, as well as standalone Monster-of-the-Week stories. Spotnitz intended the release to act as an entry point for viewers new to the series.

Production

The episodes on the collection represent the personal choices of series writers Chris Carter and Frank Spotnitz, who recorded introductions for each of their selections. Spotnitz wanted the collection to serve as an introduction to the series for those who were unfamiliar with it, noting "if you were so motivated you could go back and look at these eight episodes and really get an idea of the breadth and scope of the series".

Reception

The X-Files: Revelations was released on July 8, 2008—July 14 in region 2—and received mostly positive reviews from critics. Writing for IGN, Christopher Monfette described the release as "a cash-in" on the then-upcoming release of The X-Files: I Want to Believe. Monfette felt that the collection suffered for its lack of an cohesive theme tying its episodes together, and rated it a score of 5 out of 10.  Jack Patrick Rodgers, writing for PopMatters, felt that the collection served to "remind us of how great the show was at its peak", awarding it a score of 8 out of 10. However, Rodgers found fault with the bare-bones natures of the collection, writing that its presentation "does little to dispel the notion that it's a cheap cash-in for [I Want to Believe]". David Sutton of Fortean Times rated the collection—which was titled The X-Files: Essentials in the United Kingdom—four stars out of five, calling it "well worth a punt" for newcomers to The X-Files. However, Sutton found it difficult to pinpoint the release's target audience, pointing out that the series was known for its alien-related mythology, which he felt the collection downplayed in favour of "writerly" episodes. DVD Talk's Randy Miller recommended the set, calling it "a reminder of Carter and company's commitment to variety", and finding the bonus material to be scant but worthwhile.

Episodes

Special features

References

Revelations
Television videos and DVDs